The Black Cat is a 1981 Italian horror film directed by Lucio Fulci. Biagio Proietti co-wrote the screenplay with Fulci. It starred Patrick Magee, Mimsy Farmer, Al Cliver, David Warbeck, and Dagmar Lassander. The film is based loosely on the 1843 story of the same name by Edgar Allan Poe, and uses the violent style that typified the director's later career, following films like Don't Torture a Duckling (1972).

Plot 

Strange things are happening in a small English village, beginning when a man driving a car suddenly encounters a strange black cat in the back seat and, through the mesmerizing stare, the cat causes the man to crash his car into a lamp post, killing him. The black cat travels back to its home, a rambling old house occupied by Robert Miles, a morbid and hostile former college professor of the supernatural who is reputed to be a medium. Professor Miles lives alone except for his equally hostile black cat, and spends his time making audiotape recordings at the tombs of the recently deceased. Meanwhile, an American tourist named Jill Trevers, ventures into an open crypt to take photographs for her scrapbook when she discovers a small microphone on the floor of the place. Venturing out, she meets the local police constable Sergeant Wilson who tells her not to venture down the crypt again, saying that the dead like to be left alone.

Elsewhere, Maureen Grayson, a local outgoing teenager and her boyfriend, Stan, are in a rowboat on a nearby canal when they row to a boathouse and lock themselves in an airtight room so they can have sex. Maureen becomes nervous, and Stan discovers that the key for the locked door has disappeared. They are trapped as the room's air begins to run out.

The following day, Lillian Grayson calls the police to report her daughter's disappearance and Sergeant Wilson calls a man from Scotland Yard, Inspector Gorley who rides into town on his motorcycle and immediately gets a speeding ticket from Sergeant Wilson upon arrival at the police station. Meanwhile, Jill's search for the owner of the mini-microphone leads her to Miles, who discusses with her the barriers of perception and how to escape them. He tries to hypnotize Jill, but is prevented from doing so by the black cat, which suddenly leaps and scratches him. Jill leaves in a hurry.

That night, a local man named Ferguson leaves the local pub and walks home. The cat appears and scares him into a disused barn. When the feline appears suddenly before him, Ferguson tries to make his escape along a beam high off the ground. The cat scratches his hands as he holds onto a beam above his head to keep his balance, and he falls off to his death landing on some spikes on the ground.

The next morning, Inspector Gorley arrives at the scene and asks Jill to help photograph the dead man. As she does so, she sees cat scratches on the hands, which remind her of those suffered by Miles the previous day.

At Miles' house, Mrs. Grayson arrives and begs him to help her find her missing daughter. Miles, who is revealed to have been romantically involved with Mrs. Grayson many years ago, reluctantly agrees to help. Holding a bracelet owned by Maureen, Miles enters a trance and describes the boathouse, and the location of the missing key. The police and Mrs. Grayson rush to the scene and find all as Miles had said. Battering down the locked door, which had been locked from the inside, they discover the horribly decomposing bodies of Maureen and Stan. The key was on the tarpaulin outside, an impossible feat for a murderer since the only other way out of the room was a blocked air conditioning vent far too small for a human. That night, the cat's next victim is Mrs. Grayson herself when she gets burned to death by a fire in her house started by the malevolent feline.

Jill goes to Miles' house the following day and shows him the photographs she took of the scratches on the dead man's hands. Jill now believes that Miles exerts an evil supernatural influence over the cat, but Miles says that it's the cat who dominates him.

That night, Miles drugs the cat and takes it outdoors, hanging it by the neck from a tree branch. Supernatural forces are unleashed by the cat's death, which also hits Jill as she sleeps in her bed at the village inn. The cat appears before Miles again, now a ghostly curse on the frightened Miles. Inspector Gorley pays a late-night visit to Jill's room to discuss with her the mysterious flashes of light and occurrences that happened just an hour earlier. As he leaves, Gorley sees the evil creature himself, and gets attacked and hypnotized by it. He staggers on the road in front of a moving car and gets run over.

The next day Jill, who still thinks that Miles is the real killer, sneaks into his house when he goes out and snoops around his office, uncovering the audio recordings of his conversations with the dead. When Miles suddenly returns, she runs to hide in the cellar and encounters the black cat, which magically appears and disappears before her eyes. Running away in terror, she is cornered by Miles. He tells her that the cat has picked up on his suppressed hatred for the village folk and is acting them out without his knowledge or control. Jill runs, but is attacked, first by bats in the cellar, and then again by Miles who knocks her out with a stick.

Jill wakes up bound and gagged to find Miles walling her up alive in a space in the cellar wall. He has also taken her keys and emptied her hotel room, making it seem that she has left the village. However, Inspector Gorley, who has survived the car accident, goes with Sergeant Wilson, and his superior, Inspector Flynn, over to Miles' house and insists on searching it for signs of the cat, and Jill. They find nothing and are about to leave when they all hear a faint cry from the cat coming from the cellar. They find the newly bricked-up wall and upon battering it down, they find Jill barely alive, and the cat which was incarcerated there without Miles knowing it. As Jill is pulled out, Miles mumbles to Gorley that the cat has won and that he has fallen victim to his own evil misdeeds.

Cast
Patrick Magee as Prof. Robert Miles
Mimsy Farmer as Jill Trevers
David Warbeck as Inspector Gorley
Al Cliver as Sgt. Wilson
Dagmar Lassander as Lillian Grayson
Bruno Corazzari as Ferguson
Geoffrey Copleston as Inspector Flynn
Daniela Doria as Maureen Grayson (as Daniela Dorio)

Production
The film's original shooting title was Il gatto di Park Lane. It was shot on location in the villages of West Wycombe, Chalfont St Giles and Hambleden, Buckinghamshire, and at film studios in Rome. Filming took place between 11 August and 28 September 1980.

Release 
The Black Cat was distributed theatrically in Italy by Italian International Film on April 4, 1981. It was released theatrically in the United States in February 1984.

The film has been released on DVD in America by Anchor Bay Entertainment on May 29, 2001 and Blue Underground and in the UK by Salvation Films and Shameless Screen Entertainment.

Critical reception 

Allmovie wrote, "As usual, [Fulci] conjures up a spooky atmosphere with effortless skill – a scene with Patrick Magee wandering through a fog-shrouded graveyard at night is truly creepy – but the film's meandering script makes it sputter when it should be building in intensity. Thus, The Black Cat never rises above being an exercise in style".

References

Footnotes

Sources

External links 

 
 
 

1981 films
1981 horror films
Films about cats
Films based on The Black Cat
Films directed by Lucio Fulci
Italian horror films
1980s Italian-language films
Films scored by Pino Donaggio
Films about animals
1980s Italian films